Huduershidaogao, born Yu, was a chanyu of the Xiongnu Empire. The brother and successor of Wuzhuliu Chanyu, he reigned from 18 to 46 AD.

Biography
Yu was the eldest surviving brother of Wuzhuliu Chanyu upon his death in 13 AD, but Yu was passed over in succession in favor of his half-brother, the Wulei Chanyu. When Wulei died in 18 AD, Yu succeeded him as the Huduershidaogao Chanyu.

In 19 AD, Wang Mang set up Xubu Chanyu as a rival to Huduershidaogao and stationed a large army on the frontier. Xubu died soon afterward and the army never set out.

Huduershidaogao killed his half-brother Yituzhiyashi who was next in line to the throne and pro-Chinese.

In 24 AD, the Gengshi Emperor sent an embassy to the Xiongnu, but Huduershidaogao felt that they did not pay him proper respect. The Gengshi Emperor died in 25 AD.

In 28 AD, Huduershidaogao attacked Emperor Guangwu of Han but was defeated.

In 35 AD, the Xiongnu forced the Han to withdraw from Shuofang Commandery.

In 37 AD, the warlord Lu Fang was defeated and fled to the Xiongnu court.

In 44 AD, Xiongnu raiding parties reached as far as Tianshui, Youfufeng, and Shangdang commanderies.

In 45 AD, a Xiongnu raid attacked Zhongshan Commandery.

In 46 AD, Huduershidaogao died at the age of 80 and was succeeded by his son Wudadihou.

Footnotes

References

Bichurin N.Ya., "Collection of information on peoples in Central Asia in ancient times", vol. 1, Sankt Petersburg, 1851, reprint Moscow-Leningrad, 1950

Taskin B.S., "Materials on Sünnu history", Science, Moscow, 1968, p. 31 (In Russian)

Chanyus
46 deaths
Year of birth missing
1st-century monarchs in Asia